Hao Ting (born 23 March 2001) is a Chinese rhythmic gymnast. She competed in the group all-around at the 2020 Olympic Games where the Chinese group finished fourth.

Career 
Hao began ballet when she was six years old but switched to rhythmic gymnastics when she was eight years old. She was selected to compete for the Chinese group at the 2019 World Championships alongside Guo Qiqi, Hu Yuhui, Huang Zhangjiayang, Liu Xin, and Xu Yanshu. Hao competed in the 3 hoops + 4 clubs routine but not in the 5 balls routine. The Chinese group together finished seventh in the all-around final. Additionally, the 3 hoops + 4 clubs group qualified for the event final where they finished eighth.

Hao was selected to represent China at the 2020 Summer Olympics in the group all-around alongside Guo Qiqi, Huang Zhangjiayang, Liu Xin, and Xu Yanshu. In the qualification round, they finished fifth and qualified into the final where they finished fourth behind Bulgaria, Russia, and Italy. The same group then competed at the 2021 World Championships and finished fifth in the group all-around. In the event finals, they finished fifth in 5 balls and fourth in 3 hoops + 4 clubs.

References

External links 
 

2001 births
Living people
Chinese rhythmic gymnasts
Gymnasts at the 2020 Summer Olympics
Olympic gymnasts of China
Gymnasts from Jiangsu
21st-century Chinese women